Rotary Racer is a Greenpower team which began in 2005 as an initiative within Chipping Sodbury School to try to get 'Lads and Dads' working together on a project to build and race their own electric racing cars. The team has grown, with 9 different cars being built in the past 9 years. The team is made up of both girls and boys, ranging between the ages of 11 and 18.

The name Rotary Racer came from the team's first sponsor, Rotary International of Chipping Sodbury. This charity provided the funding needed to start the car from scratch and have continued to sponsor the team each season. Over the years, additional sponsors have enabled the team to continue racing as well as improve the car. The sponsors include:
 St Gobain Performance Plastics
 Towns Land Trust, Chipping Sodbury
 FairDiesel
 Wates
 CTEK Chargers
 BLD Group
 RAF
 Schwalble
 Beam Ltd
 Apec Ltd

Since 2005, the team has won the national championship (held at Goodwood Circuit or Rockingham Motor Speedway) five times out of the eight years.
 2008 2nd in the Country
 2009 National Champions
 2010 3rd in the Country
 2011 National Champions
 2012 National Champions
 2013 National Champions
 2014 2nd Internationally
 2015 International Champions
 2016 5th Internationally
 2017 5th Internationally

Rotary Racer takes part in the two 1-hour endurance races (F24) and the F24+ race (for sixth formers).

References
  - Rotary Racer Home Page
  - Welcome to the Greenpower Education Trust
  - Greenpower Timing and Results

General

Clubs and societies in England